Founded in 1973, the National Bank of Oman (NBO) was the first local bank in Oman.
 
NBO has over 60 branches and 173 ATMs and Cash Deposit Machines across Oman.  The bank has two international branches in Dubai and Abu Dhabi.

Leaving Egypt
In 2014 NBO left Egypt.

References

External links
Official site

Banks of Oman
Banks established in 1973
1973 establishments in Oman
Companies based in Muscat, Oman